Charles Burgess (25 December 1883 – 1956) was an English footballer who played in the Football League for Manchester City and Stoke.

Career
Burgess was born in Church Lawton and played amateur football with Butt Lane Swifts before joining Stoke in 1901, he apparently signed the contract with Stoke whilst sitting on a haystack at his father's farm. He soon became a regular member of Horace Austerberry's squad at a time when Stoke were struggling financially it came as a welcome relief to find a very capable local player. He was a solid defender who produce some had but fair challenges on opponents. He remained with Stoke until they went bankrupt in 1908 and Burgess joined Manchester City after making 195 appearances for Stoke. His time at Hyde Road was hampered by a knee injury which eventually caused him to retire.

Personal life 
Burgess served in the Royal Army Medical Corps during the First World War, firstly at No. 28 Casualty Clearing Station in Fouilloy, France and latterly at 49th Stationary Hospital in Bralos, Greece. He contracted malaria during the Salonika Campaign.

Career statistics

Honours
 Manchester City
 Football League Second Division: 1909–10

References

English footballers
Stoke City F.C. players
Manchester City F.C. players
English Football League players
1883 births
1956 deaths
British Army personnel of World War I
Royal Army Medical Corps soldiers
Association football fullbacks